() is the highlight of the German  (carnival), and takes place on the Shrove Monday before Ash Wednesday, the beginning of Lent. Mardi Gras, though celebrated on Fat Tuesday, is a similar event.  is celebrated in German-speaking countries, including Germany, Austria, Switzerland and Belgium (Eupen, Kelmis), but most heavily in the carnival strongholds which include the Rhineland, especially in Cologne, Bonn, Düsseldorf, Aachen and Mainz. In contrast to Germany, in Austria, the highlight of the carnival is not , but Shrove Tuesday.

The name for the carnival comes from the German dialect word  meaning "frolic" and  meaning Monday.

Overview

Celebrations usually include dressing up in fancy costumes, dancing, parades, heavy drinking and general public displays with floats. Every town in the  areas boasts at least one parade with floats making fun of the themes of the day. Sweets and tulips are thrown into the crowd.

See also

Clean Monday
Nickanan Night

References

External links

Monday
February observances
March observances
Carnivals in Germany